Thaddeus Coleman Pound (December 6, 1832 – November 20 or 21, 1914) was an American businessman from Wisconsin who served in both houses of the Wisconsin legislature, as the tenth Lieutenant Governor of Wisconsin, and as a U.S. Representative (1877–1883). His brother was Albert Pound, who also served in the Wisconsin Assembly. He was the grandfather of poet Ezra Pound.

Life and career

Born in Elk Township, Warren County, Pennsylvania, Pound moved with his parents, Judith Coleman and Elijah Pound, to Monroe County, New York in 1838 and then to the city of Rochester, New York, afterwards moving to what is now Rock County, Wisconsin.

He became a member of the Wisconsin State Assembly and the Wisconsin State Senate. Pound was elected as Lieutenant Governor of Wisconsin serving under Governor Lucius Fairchild from January 3, 1870 until January 1, 1872. In 1876, Pound was elected as a Republican to the Forty-fifth Congress, replacing Democrat George W. Cate in representing Wisconsin's 8th congressional district. He was reelected to the Forty-sixth and Forty-seventh Congresses (March 4, 1877 – March 3, 1883), and was succeeded in the 48th Congress by fellow Republican William T. Price.

During his time as a representative, Pound was a prominent businessman in Wisconsin. He was president of the Chippewa Falls and Western Railway and the St. Paul Eastern Grand Trunk Railway (both predecessors of the Soo Line Railroad). He also served as president of the Chippewa Spring Water Company (a company still in business as of 2008) as well as the Union Lumber Company, which was reorganized as the Chippewa Falls Lumber and Boom Company in 1879.

Death and tribute 
He died in Chicago, Illinois on November 20 or 21, 1914. The village of Pound, Wisconsin, is named in his honor.

Notes

References

External links

1832 births
1914 deaths
19th-century American railroad executives
Businesspeople from Wisconsin
Ezra Pound
Lieutenant Governors of Wisconsin
Republican Party members of the Wisconsin State Assembly
Politicians from Chippewa Falls, Wisconsin
People from Rock County, Wisconsin
People from Warren County, Pennsylvania
Republican Party Wisconsin state senators
Republican Party members of the United States House of Representatives from Wisconsin
19th-century American politicians